Fabiola lucidella is a species of concealer moth in the subfamily Oecophorinae. It was described by August Busck in 1912 as Epicallima lucidella. 

Fabiola lucidella occurs in Pennsylvania and Arkansas in the United States and has Hodges/MONA number 1052. Its type locality is Oak Station, Allegheny Co. in Pennsylvania.

References

Oecophorinae
Moths described in 1912
Moths of North America